Prostitution in Libya is illegal, but common. Since the country's Cultural Revolution in 1973, laws based on Sharia law's zina are used against prostitutes; the punishment can be 100 lashes. Exploitation of prostitutes, living off the earnings of prostitution or being involved in the running of brothels is outlawed by Article 417 of the Libyan Penal Code. Buying sexual services isn't prohibited by law, but may contravene Sharia law.

Many of the sex workers are from Nigeria (over 1,000 in 2015). There are also sex workers from other sub-Saharan African countries such as Ghana, Liberia and Sierra Leone. Desperate to flee the poverty of their countries, they have often been trafficked to Libya with the promise of a job in Italy. Some are working as prostitutes in Libya to pay off debt bondage in the hope of travelling on to Italy. 

The former leader of the country, Colonel Gaddafi, ordered the closure of Libya's brothels when he came to power in the 1969 Libyan coup d'état.

Sex trafficking

Libya is a destination and transit country for men and women from sub-Saharan Africa and Asia subjected to sex trafficking. Instability and lack of government oversight continued to allow for human trafficking crimes to persist and become highly profitable for traffickers. As reported by international organisations in 2016, trafficking victims—including men, women, and children—are highly vulnerable to extreme violence and other human rights violations in Libya by government officials.

Migrants in Libya are extremely vulnerable to trafficking, including those seeking employment in Libya or transiting Libya en route to Europe. Prostitution rings reportedly subject sub-Saharan women to sex trafficking in brothels, particularly in southern Libya. Nigerian women are at increased risk of being forced into prostitution. Trafficking and smuggling networks that reach into Libya from Niger, Nigeria, Chad, Eritrea, Ethiopia, Somalia, Sudan, and other sub-Saharan states subject migrants to forced prostitution through fraudulent recruitment, confiscation of identity and travel documents, withholding or non-payment of wages, and debt bondage. 

Since mid-2015, ISIS in Libya has abducted and taken into captivity at least 540 migrants and refugees, including at least 63 women whom ISIS forced into sexual slavery for its fighters.

The United States Department of State Office to Monitor and Combat Trafficking in Persons ranks Libya as a "Special Case" country.

References

Libya
Sexuality in Libya
Libya
Social issues in Libya
Women's rights in Libya
Human rights in Libya